The Something Like… series is a collection of books by Jay Bell, each written from a different character’s perspective that began in 2011. The plots intertwine at key points while also venturing off in new directions. The series has won a number of awards, with the first book Something Like Summer being given a film adaptation. The series ended with Something Like Stories (Volume 3) which was released in 2020.

Main series 
The order below is how the story is chronologically told - not in the order of publication year.

Something Like Summer (2011) 

From the book's back cover:

Something Like Winter (2012) 

From the book's back cover:

Something Like Autumn (2013) 

From the book's back cover:

Something Like Spring (2014) 

From the book's back cover:

Something Like Lightning (2014) 

From the book's back cover:

Something Like Thunder (2015) 

From the book's back cover:

Something Like Hail (2017) 

From the book's back cover:

Something Like Rain (2016) 

From the book's back cover:

Something Like Forever (2017)

Side stories

Something Like Stories (volume 1) (2015) 

From the book's back cover:

Something Like Stories (volume 2) (2017) 

From the book's back cover:

Something Like Stories (volume 3) (2020) 

From the book's back cover:

Film adaptation 
An Indiegogo crowdfunding campaign was launched for an initial target of $100,000. This was accomplished and casting began in late 2014. Austin P. McKenzie was initially signed on for the role of Benjamin Bentley but ultimately had to dropout because his role in Spring Awakening attained great success and he was required for additional roles. Grant Davis ultimately took over the role. The roles of Tim Wyman, Jace Holden and Allison Cross went to Davi Santos, Ben Baur and Ajiona Alexus respectively.

Characters

References 

Romance novel series
Novel series
Novels with gay themes